

Paleontologists
Gideon Algernon Mantell, the scientist who first described an herbivorous dinosaur, is born.

References

18th century in paleontology
Paleontology